Croatia competed at the World Games 2017 in Wroclaw, Poland, from 20 July 2017 to 30 July 2017.

Competitors

Beach handball 

The men's team won the silver medal in the men's tournament.

Boules Sports
Croatia  has qualified at the 2017 World Games:

Lyonnaise Men's Singles Progressive Shooting- 1 quota

References 

Nations at the 2017 World Games
2017 in Croatian sport
2017